Sequence is an abstract strategy board-and-card game. Sequence was invented by Doug Reuter. He originally called the game Sequence Five. He spent years developing the concept, and, in June 1981, granted Jax Ltd. an exclusive license to manufacture, distribute and sell the board game Sequence and its subsequent variations. The game was first sold in a retail store in 1982. In 2017, Goliath Game Company bought Jax, and in early 2018 also bought all licensor rights and now owns 100% of the game Sequence. Doug Reuter is acknowledged as the inventor of Sequence on all newly produced copies of the game - both on the box and in the printed rules.

Objective
The object of the game is to form a row of five poker chips, called a sequence, on the board by placing the chips on the board spaces corresponding to cards played from the player's hand.

Equipment
Playing Board ; Instructions; 135 poker chips (50 blue, 50 green, 35 red); two full standard card decks (52 cards each, 104 cards total; may also contain jokers).

Game rules
Sequence can be played with 2 to 12 players. If there are more than three players, all players have to be divided evenly into two or three teams before the start of the game (The game cannot be played with 5, 7, or 11 players). With two teams, players alternate their physical positions with opponents around the playing surface. With three teams, players of a team must be positioned at every third player around the playing surface.

The game board is placed on a flat surface (such as the floor or a table) with enough room to allow for the game board, the draw deck, the discard pile(s) and marker chips. The jokers, if any, are removed from the deck as they are not used in the game.

To decide who goes first, all the cards are shuffled into a single deck. Each player cuts the deck by taking as many card from the deck as they want, then flips their card stack over. The player with the lowest card becomes the dealer, and the cards are shuffled again. Each player or team then chooses a set of poker chips; all members of each team share chips of the same color (Blue and green chips are always used, while red chips are only used for three-player or three-team games).

The number of cards dealt to each player varies by the number of people playing:
 Two players: Seven cards each
 Three or four players: Six cards each
 Six players: Five cards each
 Eight or nine players: Four cards each
 Ten or twelve players: Three cards each

Each card is pictured twice on the game board, and Jacks (while necessary for game strategy) do not appear on the board.

The player to the left of the dealer goes first.

On their turn, the player chooses a card from their hand to play, then places a marker chip on one of the corresponding spaces of the game board (Example: An Ace of Diamonds is played from a player's hand; that player places a chip on the Ace of Diamonds on the board). Jacks have special powers. Two-Eyed Jacks are considered wild cards and may be used to place a chip on any open space on the board. One-Eyed Jacks allow whoever played one to remove an opponent's chip from a space. Players may use the Two-Eyed Jacks to complete a row or block an opponent, while One-Eyed Jacks can remove an opponent's advantage. One-Eyed Jacks cannot be used to remove a marker chip that is already part of a completed sequence; once a sequence is achieved by a player or team, it stands.

Each played card then goes face-up into a "Discard" pile. At the end of their turn, the player draws a new card from the draw deck, after which play passes to the player to the left.

A player may place chips on either of the appropriate card spaces as long as it is not already covered by a marker chip of any color.

If a player has a card which does not have an open space on the game board, the card is considered "dead" and may be discarded during that player's turn. The player then draws a new card from the draw deck before proceeding with normal play.

Strategy
Each corner of the board has a "Free" space that all players can use to their advantage. This space acts as if it has a chip of each color on it at all times.

To form rows, chips may be placed vertically, horizontally or diagonally. Each complete row of five (or four and a free corner space) is counted as a sequence. Sequences of the same color may intersect, but only at a single position.

Sequence rules dictate no table talk or coaching between team members and a precise order in which hands must be played (card, chip, replace card). If a player forgets to replace a card on their turn and if any of the other players points it out then, they cannot make it up in a later one and must continue playing the game with a reduced number of cards.

In a two-player or two-team game, the sequences required to win the game can be made to overlap with each other, resulting in two sequences formed by nine chips instead of ten. This is because the rules explicitly state that players may use any one of the chips from their own first sequence as part of a second one. A straight row of nine chips also counts as two sequences.

Winning
The game ends when a player or team completes a set number of sequences. In a two-player or two-team game, the number of sequences needed to win is two, while in a three-player or three-team game, only one sequence is needed to win the game.

If no one in the end manages to make the target number of sequences, the game ends in a draw.

If a player makes a sequence of 8 in a row. The game ends.

Variations

Unofficial house rules
A common alternative to standard Sequence game play is to go past the minimal number of sequences to win. Players compete to fill the entire board with complete sequences of five chips (in each player's preferred color). Keep score of one point per sequence created. Different from standard game play, chips from completed sequences may be removed to prevent opponents from scoring. For added difficulty, players may opt not to reshuffle the deck when it runs out of cards. Game play ends when the board is filled and no additional moves are possible. To declare a winner, points are tallied up for each player or team. Whoever has the most points wins the game.

Sequence can also be integrated into a drinking game for adults, where each player picks one (or two) number or face cards. Each time any of the chosen cards is discarded, by any player, the player who chose it has to drink. Last man standing (or the person who wins via the usual way) wins.

Rulebook house rules
An optional rule in the rulebook requires the player forming a sequence on the board to announce it. If left unannounced, that row will not be considered a completed sequence until the player or team's next turn, during which they can announce the sequence.

A game play variation allows pairs that become trapped by placing a chip of own color on each side of a pair of a single opponent to be removed from the board. One of three or more are not an option, but two, not a part of a sequence can be stolen by an opponent. Additionally, this allows for another option to win, namely by capturing any five pairs of any opponent.

Another variation of the original rules is called the "corner rule". Instead of corners being free places, a team must put their color token in the corner by skipping a turn. This only happens when four of their color are lined up against a corner. Another team may block by putting their token there if they have a two-eyed jack. This variation has become popular since 2010, because players felt like a small rule tweak was needed. The corner rule started as an unofficial variation, but has since been embraced by the game designer and now becomes an official rule variation also used in some championships.

Official variations

Sequence comes in several versions, including Sequence – States and Capitals; Sequence Numbers; Sequence 25th Anniversary Edition; Jumbo Sequence; Travel Sequence; Sequence Deluxe Edition; and Sequence for Kids. The major difference between the different Sequence versions is the game board sizes, shapes, and topics.

Sequence Dice
Sequence Dice is a spin-off of the Sequence board game. Instead of cards, the game uses a pair of dice. The object of Sequence Dice is to be the first player or team to connect a "sequence" of five chips in a row on the board, just as in the original game. However, a player or team only has to achieve one sequence in order to win instead of the two sometimes needed in the original, and in a two-player or two-team game, the required sequence consists of six chips in a row instead of five. In addition, a player may replace an opponent's chip with one of own color by rolling a number, but only when all four spaces for that number are already occupied. With the addition of this rule, the game does not end when the board is full.

The board displays four interlocking arrangements of the numerals 3 to 9, along with pictures of dice. The four corner spaces on the board depict dice arranged in a "snake eyes" pattern, i.e. displaying one and one. The four spaces in the center of the board depict dice showing a "boxcars" pattern or a double-six. There are also three special rolls:
 Rolling a 10 allows the player to remove an opponent's chip from the board
 Rolling an 11 allows the player to add a chip of own color to any open space on the board
 Rolling a 2 or 12 allows the player to take another turn immediately after adding a chip to any designated space on the board

Legal issues
During a series of legal disputes, Douglas Reuter claimed Jax violated its licensing agreement which would provide grounds for contract termination. In response, Jax denied any violation. Meanwhile, both sides continue to profit from game sales. Jax garners 80 percent of its revenue from Sequence; Reuter receives a royalty on sales of Sequence. Mr. Reuter has also started a new game company called, "Game Inventors of America," which is located in Corinth, Texas.

Unauthorized variations of Sequence have appeared many times over the years.  Names of the unauthorized versions include, "One-Eyed Jack," "Jack Foolery," and "Jack Off." In "One-Eyed Jack," the board is constructed using actual playing cards.

In March 2015, Jax Ltd. filed a legal claim against independent video game developer Iridium Studios over the name of their rhythm video game titled Sequence. Not wanting to pay legal fees challenging the claim, the video game developer promptly renamed their game to Before the Echo.

References

External links
How Sequence Works
How To Make a Sequence Game Board

Sequence Rules at Jax Ltd., Inc.

Abstract strategy games
Card games introduced in the 1970s
Year of introduction missing